Hippeastrum angustifolium is a bulbous perennial in the family Amaryllidaceae, native to an area from SE Brazil to Paraguay and NE Argentina.

Taxonomy 
Described by Ferdinand Albin Pax in 1890.

References

Bibliography 

 , in 
 
 H. angustifolium.
GBIF: Hippeastrum angustifolium

Flora of Brazil
Flora of South America
angustifolium
Garden plants of South America